The 2012 Latin American Table Tennis Cup was held at the Eddy Cortez National Sports Centre in San José, Costa Rica from May 25–27, 2012 and was a qualifier for the 2012 Table Tennis World Cup. A prize pool of US$10,000 was at stake. The event was the second edition of the competition and was organized by the International Table Tennis Federation, the Latin American Table Tennis Union, and the Costa Rican Table Tennis Association. Brazilian  Thiago Monteiro won the men's event; fellow Brazilian Caroline Kumahara won the women's competition.

Seeds
Seeding was based on the ITTF World Ranking lists published on May 1, 2012.

 Men's Competition
  - Latin American Champion 2012
  - South American Champion
  - London 2012 Olympic Games Qualifier
  - LATTU Ranking
  - London 2012 Olympic Games Qualifier
  - London 2012 Olympic Games Qualifier
  - LATTU Ranking
  - LATTU Ranking
  - LATTU Ranking
  - LATTU Ranking
  - Central American Champion
  - Host Nation Representative

 Women's Competition
  - London 2012 Olympic Games Qualifier
  - London 2012 Olympic Games Qualifier
  - London 2012 Olympic Games Qualifier
  - London 2012 Olympic Games Qualifier
  - 2012 Latin American Champion
  - London 2012 Olympic Games Qualifier
  - London 2012 Olympic Games Qualifier
  - South American Champion
  - LATTU Ranking
  - Caribbean Champion
  - Central American Champion
  - Host representative

Men's Competition
The twelve competitors were split into four groups of three, playing each groupmate once. The top two in each group advanced to the single-elimination bracket.

After the favorite and number one seed, Lin Ju, failed to advance beyond the group stage, the event was essentially up for grabs. In the semifinals, Thiago Monteiro defeated Gaston Alto and Liu Song beat Cazuo Matsumoto. Monteiro defeated Liu Song, 4-1, in the final to claim the title and qualify for the Liebherr World Cup. Both Matsumoto and Alto won bronze medals.

Qualification round

Group 1

Group 2

Group 3

Group 4

Main Draw

Women's Competition
The women's competition was structured in the same way as the men's event.

Carelyn Cordero upset the number one seed in the quarterfinals in a seven-set thriller. After defeating Fabiola Ramos in the semifinals, Cordero fell to Caroline Kumahara in the championship.

Qualification round

Group 1

Group 2

Group 3

Group 4

Main Draw

See also 
 Latin American Table Tennis Cup

References 

Latin American Table Tennis Cup
International sports competitions hosted by Costa Rica
Latin American Table Tennis Cup
2012 in South American sport